Vladimir Yurzinov Jr. (born March 26, 1965 in Moscow, Soviet Union) is the son of Vladimir Yurzinov. He was head coach of the Ilves Tampere from 1996-1997 in the SM-liiga. In 2016, he became the coach of Kunlun Red Star of the Kontinental Hockey League, the league's first Chinese franchise.

References

External links

1965 births
Living people
Russian ice hockey coaches
Ice hockey people from Moscow
HC Kunlun Red Star

Ässät coaches